The silver scabbardfish (Lepidopus caudatus), also known as the frostfish or beltfish is a benthopelagic cutlassfish of the family Trichiuridae found throughout the temperate seas of the world.

References

 
 Tony Ayling & Geoffrey Cox, Collins Guide to the Sea Fishes of New Zealand,  (William Collins Publishers Ltd, Auckland, New Zealand 1982) 

Trichiuridae
Fish described in 1788